Eudontomyzon vladykovi, or Vladykov's lamprey, is a species of lamprey in the family Petromyzontidae. It is found in Austria, Germany, The Czech Republic, Bulgaria, Romania, Serbia, and Montenegro.

References 

vladykovi
Fish of Europe
Taxonomy articles created by Polbot
Fish described in 1959